Alcoià is a comarca in the province of Alicante, Valencian Community, Spain.

Municipalities 
The comarca contains eight municipalities, listed below with their areas and populations:

References

Notes 

 
Comarques of the Valencian Community
Geography of the Province of Alicante